SS Hatarana was a steam merchant cargo ship built in Japan in 1917 and owned by the British-India Steam Navigation Company. She was sunk without loss of life near the Azores during the Battle of the Atlantic in the Second World War.

German U-Boat commander Günther Reeder claimed that at 18:52 hours on Tuesday 18 August 1942, U-214 fired four torpedoes at the convoy SL-118 comprising 34 vessels sailing from Freetown, Sierra Leone to the United Kingdom. Admiralty war diaries record that Hatarana was torpedoed at 19:03 hours. A rescue tug was sent from Gibraltar, but was recalled after it was reported that Hatarana had sunk.

The remaining 88 survivors of the 98 crew members and ten gunners were picked up by the Corabella.

Her master on the final voyage was Percival Arthur Clifton James (1887–1967), brother of M. E. Clifton James. Another survivor of the Hatarana sinking was Alan Bristow.

References 

Ships of the British India Steam Navigation Company
Steamships of the United Kingdom
Ships built by Kawasaki Heavy Industries
1917 ships
World War I merchant ships of the United Kingdom
World War II merchant ships of the United Kingdom
World War II shipwrecks in the Atlantic Ocean
Maritime incidents in August 1942
Ships sunk by German submarines in World War II
Standard World War I ships